The Yamaha DT is a series of motorcycles  and  mopeds produced by the Yamaha Motor Corporation. The first DT model, the DT-1, was released in 1968 and quickly sold through its initial 12,000 production run.

The DT series was created by Yamaha in the late 1960s when the United States motorcycle market was down. Market research by Yamaha indicated that, despite slow motorcycle sales, there was a largely untapped market for off-road motorcycles. At the time, only a few specialty European manufacturers such as Bultaco and Husqvarna made motorcycles specifically for off-road use. Instead, many owners purchased road motorcycles and modified them for off-road use, typically by raising the muffler, adding braced handlebars, and fitting a bash plate under the engine . Such modifications were commonly known as creating scramblers. The first DT model, the DT-1 trail bike, was released in 1968 and quickly sold out.

DT-1
With the introduction of the DT-1, Yamaha essentially defined a new market for motorcycles.
A Dual-sport motorcycle built for off-road riding, the light and slim DT-1 was equipped with block-pattern tires and had sufficient ground clearance. Its design put it at the cutting edge of off-road bikes at that time. It had a 250 cc, single-cylinder, 5-port engine based on a motocross design, and Ceriani-type front suspension.

The Society of Automotive Engineers of Japan , included the 1968 Yamaha Trail 250 (aka DT-1) as one of their 240 Landmarks of Japanese Automotive Technology.

A monoshock rear suspension system was introduced starting in 1977 giving rise to the "MX" prefix on model numbers.

Models in the DT series 

DT50LC
DT50M
DT50MX
DT50R
DT50X
DT80MX
DT80LC
DT80R
DT100MX
DT100R
DT100E
DT125
DT125LC
DT125MX
DT125R
DT125X
DT125RE
DT175
DT175MX 
DT  
DT180
DT200R
DT230 Lanza
DT250
DT250MX
DT250R
DT350LC
DT350R
DT360
DT400B
DT400MX

References

 

DT-1
Motorcycles introduced in 1968
Two-stroke motorcycles
Off-road motorcycles